Crims is a British television sitcom created by Dan Swimer and Adam Kay. It centres on two men sent to a young offenders' institution after one of them involves the unaware other in a bank robbery. It was screened in early 2015 on BBC Three. In May 2015, the BBC confirmed the show would not be renewed.

Cast and characters 
 Elis James as Luke 
 Kadiff Kirwan as Jason 
 Lashana Lynch as Gemma, Jason's sister and Luke's girlfriend
 Cariad Lloyd as Dawn, an officer at the institution
 Ricky Champ as Creg, an officer at the institution
 Theo Barklem-Biggs as Marcel, a fellow young offender
 Tracy Ann Oberman as Governor Riley

Cultural references
On the radio show and podcast Elis James hosts with comedian John Robins, James' starring role in Crims became a running gag, with Robins heavily implying that Crims was of poor quality, and pretending to believe that it was called 'Crimes', while mocking the fact that James, despite portraying a  teenager, was 34 at the time of Crims' broadcast.

References

External links 
 

2015 British television series debuts
2015 British television series endings
2010s British crime comedy television series
2010s British prison television series
2010s British sitcoms
BBC prison television shows
BBC television sitcoms
English-language television shows